Viamedia is a cable television and digital advertising company headquartered in Lexington, Kentucky. Viamedia provides advertising sales management for cable TV operators, MVPD's, telcos, OTT/streaming and video providers across the US. Viamedia is one of the industry's leading providers of media advertising solutions for local, regional and national businesses and brands. The company currently has more than 12,000 active and prospective advertisers nationwide.

Viamedia sells cross media advertising on behalf of U.S. cable and telecommunications service providers, utility companies and municipalities. The company manages the sales, operational and technical functions for 60 cable companies across 71 designated market areas (DMAs) in over 30 states. Viamedia has more than 300 employees nationwide.

History
Viamedia was founded in 2001 by Jeff Carter and Todd Donnelly. In January 2011, Viamedia announced that it had partnered with Lake Capital, a private equity firm headquartered in Chicago, Illinois. In December 2020, the company promoted former Chief Revenue Officer, David Solomon, to president and CEO.

Since the company's inception, they have earned the Multichannel News’ Innovator Award for technological developments in audience targeting and reporting, been named a Top Operator by Cablefax and have received the Affiliate and Partnership Marketing award at the 2014 FAXIE Awards during its "Your Partner for Ad Sales" campaign.

Placemedia
Placemedia is an automated planning and buying solution for television advertising. The company utilizes consumer databases and a proprietary technology platform that automatically places media buys to reach targeted audiences.

The company currently represents more than 30 billion impressions monthly in nearly 100 million households across 210 DMAs.

In 2018, Altice USA purchased Placemedia from Viamedia.

Placemedia's platform connects agencies and advertisers with television advertising inventory from Placemedia's partners, multichannel video programming distributors (MVPDs) and cable TV networks. Using its application program interface (API), Placemedia's advertising platform has been integrated into demand side platform (DSP) partners’ preexisting systems.

Services
Viamedia provides advertising solutions for more than 12,000 local, regional and national advertisers, including inserting advertising onto cable networks such as ESPN, TNT, FOX News, Lifetime, HGTV, A&E, Hallmark Channel and others. In addition, the company has a relationship with National Cable Communications, the national TV advertising sales, marketing and technology company owned in partnership by Comcast, Charter Communications, and Cox Communications.

Awards and recognition
In 2016, former Viamedia CEO, Mark Lieberman, was inducted as a Cable Center Cable Pioneer.

Viamedia executives have been named to the Cablefax Top 100; Cablefax Most Powerful Women in Cable; Cynopsis Top Women in Digital; Cablefax Most Powerful Women in Technology; and Multichannel News’ "40 Under 40" list.

Viamedia received the Affiliate and Partnership Marketing award at the 2014 FAXIE Awards in NYC for its "Your Partner for Ad Sales" campaign.

Viamedia's programmatic platform, Placemedia, was awarded the 2014 Innovator Award by Multichannel News.

Viamedia was named a Top Operator by Cablefax in 2013 and 2014.

In 2014, Viamedia was named one of the Top 100 Companies in Fiber to the Home Industry by Broadband Communities.

References 

Mass media companies established in 2001
Television advertising